Harbison Canyon is a census-designated place (CDP) in San Diego County, California. Harbison Canyon had a population of 4,048 as of the 2020 census, up from 3,841 as of the 2000 census.

Geography
According to the United States Geological Survey (USGS) Harbison Canyon is located at  (32.8203296, -116.8300236), which is near the intersection of Harbison Canyon Road and Frances Drive. This is where most maps place the community. It is located in a canyon between Crest and Alpine. Mail sent to Harbison Canyon is addressed to El Cajon.

According to the United States Census Bureau Harbison Canyon is located at  (32.821101, -116.840051). This is approximately 3,100 feet west of the USGS location in undeveloped hills west of the community.

Demographics

2010
At the 2010 census Harbison Canyon had a population of 3,841. The racial makeup of Harbison Canyon was 3,404 (88.6%) White, 12 (0.3%) African American, 74 (1.9%) Native American, 71 (1.8%) Asian, 6 (0.2%) Pacific Islander, 145 (3.8%) from other races, and 129 (3.4%) from two or more races. Hispanic or Latino of any race were 623 people (16.2%).

The census reported that 3,838 people (99.9% of the population) lived in households, 3 (0.1%) lived in non-institutionalized group quarters, and no one was institutionalized.

There were 1,343 households, 462 (34.4%) had children under the age of 18 living in them, 804 (59.9%) were opposite-sex married couples living together, 154 (11.5%) had a female householder with no husband present, 76 (5.7%) had a male householder with no wife present.  There were 73 (5.4%) unmarried opposite-sex partnerships, and 14 (1.0%) same-sex married couples or partnerships. 221 households (16.5%) were one person and 70 (5.2%) had someone living alone who was 65 or older. The average household size was 2.86.  There were 1,034 families (77.0% of households); the average family size was 3.19.

The age distribution was 857 people (22.3%) under the age of 18, 354 people (9.2%) aged 18 to 24, 851 people (22.2%) aged 25 to 44, 1,363 people (35.5%) aged 45 to 64, and 416 people (10.8%) who were 65 or older.  The median age was 42.4 years. For every 100 females, there were 103.9 males.  For every 100 females age 18 and over, there were 101.5 males.

There were 1,413 housing units at an average density of 140.5 per square mile, of the occupied units 1,160 (86.4%) were owner-occupied and 183 (13.6%) were rented. The homeowner vacancy rate was 2.3%; the rental vacancy rate was 1.6%.  3,277 people (85.3% of the population) lived in owner-occupied housing units and 561 people (14.6%) lived in rental housing units.

2000
At the 2000 census there were 3,645 people, 1,274 households, and 983 families in the CDP. The population density was 362.7 inhabitants per square mile (140.0/km). The racial makeup of the CDP was 90.67% White, 0.47% African American, 1.78% Native American, 1.15% Asian, 0.11% Pacific Islander, 2.22% from other races, and 3.59% from two or more races. Hispanic or Latino of any race were 10.70%.

Of the 1,274 households 37.3% had children under the age of 18 living with them, 63.9% were married couples living together, 8.2% had a female householder with no husband present, and 22.8% were non-families. 16.9% of households were one person and 4.7% were one person aged 65 or older.  The average household size was 2.86 and the average family size was 3.22.

The age distribution was 27.4% under the age of 18, 7.1% from 18 to 24, 29.8% from 25 to 44, 27.6% from 45 to 64, and 8.1% 65 or older.  The median age was 38 years. For every 100 females, there were 104.1 males.  For every 100 females age 18 and over, there were 100.2 males.

The median household income was $56,975 and the median family income  was $60,913. Males had a median income of $41,058 versus $31,371 for females. The per capita income for the CDP was $23,914.  About 5.1% of families and 4.8% of the population were below the poverty line, including 4.6% of those under age 18 and 3.6% of those age 65 or over.

History

John Stewart Harbison
John Stewart Harbison was born the third child of William and Margaret (Curry) Harbison, on a farm near Freedom, Beaver County, Pennsylvania, on September 29, 1826. 
 
He became a beekeeper in the tradition of his father, and later migrated to the west coast of the United States.  After spending some years in other California locations, he eventually arrived in San Diego aboard the ship Orizaba with one hundred and ten colonies of bees on November 28, 1869.  In the spring of 1874 he moved with his wife and daughter to a homestead near the Sweetwater River twenty-three miles east of San Diego in a small valley now known as Harbison Canyon. Within seven years time, he was the largest producer of honey in the world, operating two thousand to three thousand hives.  At that time, having several hundred hives was considered a large operation.

His success in capitalizing on the vast honey potential of San Diego County, along with his extensive campaign of selling bees to the residents of the county was the major force in making San Diego County the greatest honey-producing county in the State of California by 1874, which in turn made California the leading honey producing state of the Union. John Harbison was a major contributor to the theory of bee culture with his development of new tools and methods that characterized the remarkable advances made in nineteenth century apicultural science.  Harbison and his brother William were both important 19th century American authors on bee keeping science.  Furthermore, he opened up the great retail markets east of the Mississippi River needed to absorb the tremendous honey crops produced in California. Harbison, known as the "King of the Beekeepers"  died on October 12, 1912, in San Diego at the age of eighty-six.

Fires
Harbison Canyon was twice devastated by wildfires, first by the Laguna Fire in 1970 then again by the Cedar Fire on October 26, 2003, the worst firestorm in California history. The town lost 370 homes out of 420 in the community. Homes were still being rebuilt as recently as 2007. The community was bestowed considerable attention by the news media, which led to a visit within weeks by Governor Gray Davis, Governor-elect Arnold Schwarzenegger, his wife Maria (Kennedy-Schriver) Schwarzenegger and President George W Bush. The president arrived by helicopter which landed on the grounds of the Shadow Hills Elementary School.

The community received help in rebuilding from many organizations, most notably from the New York Says Thank You Foundation which was created in response to the tremendous support given to New Yorkers from people all over the United States after the September 11 attacks.  Since 2003, the Harbison Canyon Lions Club has participated in numerous post-disaster rebuilding projects around the U.S. sponsored by the NYSTY Foundation.

Attractions 
Harbison Canyon, apart from its unfortunate encounters with wildfires, is best known among locals for the presence of Old Ironsides Park, maintained by the County of San Diego Parks and Recreation. Kumeyaay Indian relics can be found near the stream that runs through the park and Canyon. The park also has a community center building where community and civic groups meet.

Government

References

Census-designated places in San Diego County, California
East County (San Diego County)
Census-designated places in California